Nicholas Barry Hekma (1906-1969) was a sailor from the United States, who represented his country at the 1928 Summer Olympics in Amsterdam, Netherlands.

Sources
 

American male sailors (sport)
Sailors at the 1928 Summer Olympics – 8 Metre
Olympic sailors of the United States
1906 births
1969 deaths